Ad-Da'i Ahmad bin Ali al-Fathi (died 1349) was a claimant to the Zaidi state in Yemen, who posed as imam in 1329–1349, in rivalry with other figures.

Ad-Da'i (Missionary) Ahmad bin Ali al-Fathi was a seventh-generation descendant of Imam Abu'l-Fath an-Nasir ad-Dailami (d. 1053). He originated from the village Wakash in the Bani Matar area west of San'a. After the death of Imam al-Mahdi Muhammad bin al-Mutahhar in 1328, several pretenders surfaced. Ahmad bin Ali al-Fathi made his da'wa (call for the imamate) in 1329, from his base in the Sufian area. He is sometimes known by the title ad-Da'i (the one who practices da'wa). However, he had to contend with three other claimants called al-Mu'ayyad Yahya (d. 1346), an-Nasir Ali bin Salah (d. 1329), and al-Wathiq al-Mutahhar (d. 1379–80). The competition was fierce and many people died. Al-Mu'ayyad Yahya soon triumphed, and stood out as the main political force in the Zaidi territory until his death in 1346. The career of Ahmad bin Ali al-Fathi after c. 1330 is obscure. He died in Rughafa, close to Sa'dah, in 1349.

See also

 Imams of Yemen
 Rassids

References

Zaydi imams of Yemen
1349 deaths
Year of birth unknown
14th-century Arabs